Felipe Gil de Mena (1603 Antigüedad, Palencia, Spain – 1673), was a Spanish baroque painter.

Biography
Gil de Mena was born in Antigüedad (Palencia). Around 1619 he moved to Valladolid where he became an apprentice of Diego Valentín Díaz (1586-1660), the most important artist in the city at that time. In his Lives, Palomino states that the artist went to the court in Madrid where he met Juan van der Hamen. Although this information seems no more than anecdotal, there is certainly an evident influence of Van der Hamen's work on Gil de Mena's paintings and it is known that his master owned various still lifes by that artist, with which Gil de Mena must have been familiar. His style has also been associated with the work of another Valladolid artist, Antonio de Pereda (1611-1678), although again there is no documentary proof of contact between them. In 1640 he received one of the most important commissions of his career, to decorate the cloister of the monastery of San Francisco in the city, for which he painted 32 works on the saint's life. Gil de Mena consequently became one of the most sought-after artists in the area, primarily painting for the religious communities. He combined this activity with the production of altarpieces for numerous churches in towns and villages in the area.

References
Scholarly articles in English about Felipe Gil de Mena both in web and [NO HAY CATALOGUE NOTE PDF] @ the Spanish Old Masters Gallery
Bosarte, Isidoro, Viaje artístico a varios pueblos de España, Madrid, 1804, Imprenta Real, book I, p. 143.
Palomino, Antonio, El museo pictórico y escala óptica III. El parnaso español pintoresco laureado, Madrid, 1988, Aguilar S.A. de Ediciones. .
Pérez Sánchez, Alfonso E., Pintura barroca en España 1600-1750, Madrid, 1992, Cátedra, p. 121.

1603 births
1673 deaths
Spanish Baroque painters
17th-century Spanish painters
Spanish male painters
Date of birth missing
Date of death missing
Place of death missing
People from the Province of Palencia